Salimova is a feminine surname. Its equivalent for males is Salimov. It may refer to:
 Ekaterina Salimova (born 1982), Russian female water polo player 
 Nurgyul Salimova (born 2003), Bulgarian chess player 
Ravilja Salimova (1941-2019), Uzbek basketball player